Bakerite is the common name given to hydrated calcium boro-silicate hydroxide, a borosilicate mineral (chemical formula Ca4B4(BO4)(SiO4)3(OH)3·(H2O)) that occurs in volcanic rocks in the Baker, California area. Discredited mineral: IMA2016-A.

It was first described in 1903 for an occurrence in the Corkscrew Canyon Mine of the Black Mountains, Furnace Creek District, Death Valley National Park, Inyo County, California, US. It was named for Richard C. Baker, a director of the Pacific Coast Borax Company.

References

Borate minerals
Nesosilicates
Monoclinic minerals
Minerals in space group 14
Borosilicates